Kaluzhanka was a women's football club from Kaluga. The team set up on the initiative Mikhail Ivanovich Sushanov, at first the team has funded a sewing factory  Kaluzhanka  whose name and had a team.

Because of financial difficulties the club in 1999 ceased to exist. Youth team was framed in a new club  Annenki.

Achievements

 Bronze medalist Championship of Russia 1994

Bombardiers
   19 Olga Letyushova

References

External links
 Championships Russia

Association football clubs established in 1990
Association football clubs disestablished in 1999
Defunct football clubs in Russia
Women's football clubs in Russia
Sport in Kaluga
1990 establishments in Russia
1999 disestablishments in Russia